Suporn Peenagatapho is a Thai professional footballer who plays as a full back for Thai League 1 club Muangthong United.

Honours

Club
Muangthong United
 Mekong Club Championship (1): 2017

External links
 

1995 births
Living people
Suporn Peenagatapho
Suporn Peenagatapho
Suporn Peenagatapho
Association football defenders
Suporn Peenagatapho
Suporn Peenagatapho
Suporn Peenagatapho